Below are the squads for the Football at the 2013 Southeast Asian Games - women's tournament, hosted by Myanmar, which took place between 10 and 20 December 2013.

Group A

Myanmar
Head coach:  Yoshinori Kumada

Philippines
Head coach: Ernest Nierras

Vietnam
Head coach:  Chen Yun Fa

Group B

Laos
Head coach:  Honma Kei

Malaysia
Head coach: Jacob Joseph

Thailand
Head coach: Jatuporn Pramualban

References

Football at the 2013 Southeast Asian Games